Philip Arctander (1916–1994) was a Danish architect. He exhibited at the Charlottenborg Spring Exhibition in 1942. Later, he served as director of the Danish Building Research Institute.

See also
List of Danish architects

References

1916 births
1994 deaths
Recipients of the Eckersberg Medal
20th-century Danish architects